Solly Afrika Mapaila is a South African politician who is the incumbent General Secretary of the South African Communist Party, he was elected unopposed on the 15th of July 2022 in his current position at the SACP National Congress. Solly Mapaila was appointed as the Second Deputy General Secretary of the South African Communist Party in 2012.

Activism
Mapaila was a member of Umkhonto weSizwe and operated outside of South Africa prior to 1994. On returning to South Africa in 1994 he was integrated into the South African Defence Force and stationed at Thaba Tshwane.

Work
He is a forceful and determined critic of corruption within the African National Congress and the South African government, and of the leadership of South African president Jacob Zuma. The group of president Zuma supporters threaten him to open criminal charges against him if he continues to say that president is corrupt

Mapaila has directly questioned the purported intelligence report titled "Operation Checkmate" used by President Jacob Zuma to fire the former Minister of Finance. Pravin Gordhan He has led calls from within the Tripartite Alliance for the resignation of President Jacob Zuma.

Mapaila is considered a leading candidate to succeed Blade Nzimande as general secretary of the SACP when the party holds leadership elections in 2017.

References

Living people
People from Msunduzi Local Municipality
South African Communist Party politicians
African National Congress politicians
Year of birth missing (living people)